Mariko Yamada (born October 23, 1950) is a former Democratic assemblywoman from California's 4th Assembly district. She was elected in 2008 after defeating West Sacramento Mayor Christopher Cabaldon in a competitive Democratic primary, a defeat that many considered an upset win for Yamada. She was the third consecutive woman from Davis to be elected to this seat, following in the footsteps of Helen Thomson and Lois Wolk.

In 2016, Yamada lost the election for the seat representing California's 3rd State Senate district to Bill Dodd.

Personal
Both of Yamada's parents were held in Japanese internment camps during World War II. Yamada grew up attending inner-city schools and later became the first member of her family to complete college and graduate school. She lives in Davis with her husband, Janlee Wong. They have two children — Meilee and Midori.

Education
Yamada received her undergraduate degree from the University of Colorado and received her master's degree in social work from the University of Southern California.

Political career
Prior to serving in the Assembly, Yamada represented the city of Davis on the Yolo County Board of Supervisors from 2003-2008.

Career
Yamada's experience includes a decade in Washington, D.C. in federal service, first with the U.S. Census Bureau working on the undercount reduction campaign of the 1980 Census. She later worked as an investigator with Civil Rights division of the United States Department of Commerce. She also co-produced and co-hosted "Gold Mountain, D.C.", a jazz and information show on WPFW 89.3 FM.

References

1950 births
Living people
American social workers
Democratic Party members of the California State Assembly
California politicians of Japanese descent
County supervisors in California
People from Davis, California
Politicians from Denver
University of Colorado alumni
USC Suzanne Dworak-Peck School of Social Work alumni
Women state legislators in California
American politicians of Japanese descent
American women of Japanese descent in politics
21st-century American politicians
21st-century American women politicians